Hansell can refer to:

Anna Hansell, British physician
Ellen Hansell, American tennis player
 Greg Hansell, American baseball player
 Haywood S. Hansell (1903–1988), American Air Force general
A.J. Hansell, a general, also known as Andrew Jackson Hansell, an owner of Mimosa Hall in Roswell Historic District (Roswell, Georgia)
 Hansell, Iowa, a town in the United States